Staircase Falls is a series of waterfalls located on the southern side of Yosemite Valley in Yosemite National Park, California. The falls descend a total of  into Yosemite Valley over a series of steps. Staircase Falls is relatively ephemeral and is usually dry by the end of the month of June. The falls are located immediately behind Camp Curry on cliffs below Glacier Point.

References

Waterfalls of Yosemite National Park
Waterfalls of Mariposa County, California
Tiered waterfalls